Munabao is a Bordering Village, just 125 km from Barmer city in the Barmer district in Rajasthan, India. It has bordering Pakistan. It is one of the designated border crossing between two nations, where a daily beating retreat border ceremony is held. Munabao is served by the Munabao railway station on Marwar Junction–Munabao line, through which once-a-week Thar Express train used to run between India (from Bhagat Ki Kothi near Jodhpur) and Pakistan (Karachi), passing through Munabao on India side,  border station, Khokhrapar on Pakistan side.

It is 125 km west of district headquarter Barmer, 177 km southwest of Jaisalmer, 660 km west of state capital Jaipur, 931 km from national capital New Delhi. Just across the border is Khokhrapar village in Pakistan, which is 141 km north of district HQ Mithi and 370 km northeast of Sindh's provincial capital Karachi.The movie THAR featuring Anil Kapoor is also said to be filmed in this bordering village.

History

During the 1965 war, the village came under the control of Pakistan.

Transport 
From 2006 to 2019, a train service used to run once-a-week between Bhagat Ki Kothi near Jodhpur and Karachi, Pakistan, passing through Munabao on India side,  border station, Khokhrapar on Pakistan side.  This train is known as the Thar Express. It was the second active rail connection between India and Pakistan after the Wagah link in Punjab. Thar link express was extended for 3 years period from 1 February 2018 to 31 January 2021, but as of 9 August 2019, the train has been cancelled until further notice due to escalating tensions between India and Pakistan.
 
There is also a passenger train between Munabao and Barmer.

Munbao-Khokhrapar border ceremony 

It is one of the designated site where India-Pakistan jointly host a beating retreat flag ceremony every day at 6 pm which is open for the public and tourists for the viewing. This ceremony is similar to the more popular Wagah-Attari border ceremony held near Amritsar.

See also 
 Battle of Munabao
 Attari
 Hussainiwala
 India–Pakistan border
 Borders of India 
 North Western Railway zone

References 

 Munaba, India Page
 Munaaba VILLAGE

India–Pakistan border crossings
Villages in Barmer district